Teen Yaari Katha (Bengali: তিন ইয়ারী কথা; English: Tale of Three Friends) is a 2012 Bengali language comedy film by the director team of Sudeshna Roy and Abhijit Guha.  The Bengali musical group Bhoomi composed the film's music.  The film tells the story of three middle class friends and their personal struggles. The film's release was delayed by censors due to its sexual themes. It premiered at the 2006 Osian Film Festival and was screened at the World Film Festival of Bangkok and the Kolkata Film Festival.

Synopsis
Billu sells newspapers, Shyamal drives an autorickshaw and Antu is unemployed.  The friends share a room in Billu's uncle's house in the Kolkata suburbs.  Each friend becomes involved with different girls; Antu secretly likes fellow acting student Dola, Shyamal has fallen for his boss cum lanlord's daughter Mamoni, and Biloo's crush is Paoli Dam (unnamed in the film) but three of them, mostly Biloo is obsessed with Sreeradha who lives next door.

Cast
 Rudranil Ghosh as Shyamal
 Neel Mukherjee as Biloo
 Parambrata Chatterjee as Antu
 Gargi Roychowdhury as Dola di
 Biplab Chatterjee as Biloo's Uncle
 Gita Dey as Biloo's grandmother
 Rimjhim Mitra as Mamoni
 Saswata Chatterjee as Ajoy
 June Malia as Sreeradha
 Paoli Dam as Biloo's love interest
 Rajesh Sharma as Sentu da

References

External links 
 

2012 films
Bengali-language Indian films
Films set in Kolkata
2010s Bengali-language films
Films scored by Bhoomi
Films directed by Abhijit Guha and Sudeshna Roy
Films scored by Anupam Roy